The 1932 Yale Bulldogs football team was an American football team that represented Yale University as an independent during the 1932 college football season.  In its fifth year under head coach Mal Stevens, the team compiled a 2–2–3 record, scored 41 points, and allowed opponents also to score 41 points. The team played its home games at the Yale Bowl in New Haven, Connecticut.

Halfback Robert Lassiter was selected by Parke Davis on his 1932 All-America team. Tackle John Wilbur was selected by the New York Sun as a second-team All-American.

Schedule

References

Yale
Yale Bulldogs football seasons
Yale Bulldogs football